Angus Ian MacPherson (born 11 October 1968) is a Scottish football former player and coach.

MacPherson's playing career saw spells at Rangers, Exeter City, Kilmarnock, Dunfermline Athletic and St Mirren.

His management career began at his final playing club St Mirren (initially as a player-manager), who he guided to promotion in 2006. MacPherson has since managed Queen of the South and Queen's Park who he guided to promotion in 2016. He returned to St Mirren in September 2018 in an advisory role, a position he held until August 2020. MacPherson then had a stint as manager of Greenock Morton.

Playing career

Rangers and loan to Exeter City

MacPherson started his career as a youth player with Rangers, but was unable to break into the first team, spending a period on loan to English side Exeter City.

Kilmarnock

In 1991, he moved to Kilmarnock, where he would enjoy the most successful period of his career becoming a regular fixture in the Rugby Park first team. He went on to play over 350 games at Kilmarnock and also was in the side that won the Scottish Cup with a 1–0 win over Falkirk at Ibrox Stadium.

Dunfermline Athletic

MacPherson left Kilmarnock in 2001 to join Dunfermline Athletic for two seasons before moving to St Mirren as player/assistant manager in 2003.

Manager career

St Mirren

MacPherson was then appointed as player/manager on 18 December 2003 after the resignation of John Coughlin. He retired from playing to concentrate solely on management at the end of the 2003–04 season.

MacPherson guided St Mirren to second in 2004–05 finishing behind Falkirk. This was a significant improvement for the club having finished seventh the previous season. In the following season MacPherson guided St Mirren back to the Scottish Premier League having finished top of the First Division. He also guided the team to a 2–1 win in the Scottish League Challenge Cup final against Hamilton Academical with Simon Lappin and John Sutton netting the goals, becoming the only St Mirren manager to win a domestic double.

In the 2006–07 season he retained St Mirren's place in the SPL, following a brief relegation fight. In the second last game of the season St Mirren's place in the SPL was confirmed courtesy of a 3–2 win over Motherwell despite having been 2–0 down. This coupled with other results saw one of MacPherson's former clubs, Dunfermline relegated to the First Division.

In the following season and being continually challenged with budgetary constraints, MacPherson became the first St Mirren manager to be knocked out of both the Scottish League Cup and Scottish Cup by teams from a lower league in the same season. Despite these set-backs he retained St Mirren's SPL status with 10th place in the division. This was St Mirren's highest finish since the 1990–91 season, finishing one place above MacPherson's former club Kilmarnock and relegated Gretna.

In the 2008–09 season he led St Mirren to a win over Rangers at Love Street with Stephen McGinn netting the only goal of the game. Also in the same season he led St Mirren on a run of four unbeaten games, resulting in him receiving the SPL manager of the month award for December 2008. He also guided them to the semi-finals of the Scottish Cup, beating Celtic 1–0 in the quarter finals. This result came just a week after a 7–0 defeat at Celtic Park. St Mirren were in a five club relegation battle, but a penultimate weekend win away to Falkirk, almost guaranteed safety. St Mirren stayed in the top flight on goal difference, two goals better off than Inverness.

In January 2010, after Jim Jefferies left Kilmarnock, MacPherson became the longest serving manager in the SPL. On 11 May 2010, St Mirren announced that they had parted company with MacPherson.

Queen of the South

In June 2011, MacPherson was announced as the new manager of Dumfries club, Queen of the South on a one-year contract. His assistant manager was announced as Andy Millen. MacPherson left the club after they were relegated to the Second Division in April 2012.

Queen's Park

MacPherson was appointed manager of Scottish League Two side Queen's Park in January 2014. He led the "Spiders" to promotion to Scottish League One through the play-offs in his second full season in charge beating Clyde over two legs in the playoff final. The club enjoyed two seasons in the third flight before relegation via play-offs in May 2018.

MacPherson left Queen's Park on 18 September 2018 to become the St Mirren technical director. He left St Mirren in August 2020.

Greenock Morton 
In March 2021, MacPherson was appointed manager of Scottish Championship side Greenock Morton until the end of the 2020–21 season. He led the Ton to safety after winning the Scottish Championship play-offs beating Airdrieonians in the two-legged final in May 2021. McPherson parted company with Greenock Morton on 4 December 2021, with the team sitting in 8th place (ahead of the relegation places on goal difference).

Managerial Record

Honours and achievements

Player
Kilmarnock
 Scottish First Division promotion: 1992–93
 Scottish Cup: 1996–97

Manager
St Mirren
 Scottish Challenge Cup: 2005-06
 Scottish First Division: 2005-06

Queen's Park
 Scottish League One play-offs: 2015-16

References 

https://www.bbc.co.uk/sport/football/57788350

External links 

1968 births
Living people
Footballers from Glasgow
Association football defenders
Scottish footballers
Scottish Premier League players
Scottish Football League players
Rangers F.C. players
Exeter City F.C. players
Kilmarnock F.C. players
Dunfermline Athletic F.C. players
St Mirren F.C. players
Scottish football managers
Scottish Premier League managers
St Mirren F.C. managers
St Mirren F.C. non-playing staff
Queen of the South F.C. managers
Scottish Football League managers
English Football League players
Queen's Park F.C. managers
Scottish Professional Football League managers
People educated at Lenzie Academy
Greenock Morton F.C. managers